This is an experimental form of intensity-modulated radiotherapy where higher X-ray dosages are used in fewer fractions (sessions) this is called hypofractionated radiotherapy. Although the dose per fraction is higher than standard radiotherapy, the total dose is lower.

The hope is that it will be as effective but cause less toxicity.

Prostate cancer
One trial for prostate cancer ran in 2011. In 2016 the HYPRO study reported results comparing the use of standard fractionation (39 fractions of 2 Gy for 8 weeks) with hypofractionation (with 19 fractions of 3.4 Gy for 6.5 weeks) among 820 patients with intermediate- or high-risk prostate cancer.

References

Radiation therapy procedures